The 1973 Buckeye Tennis Championships was a men's tennis tournament played on outdoor hard courts at the Buckeye Boys Ranch in Grove City, Columbus, Ohio in the United States that was part of Group C of the 1973 Grand Prix circuit. It was the fourth edition of the tournament and was held  from July 30 through August 5, 1973. First-seeded Jimmy Connors won his second consecutive singles title at the event and earned $5,000 first-prize money.

Finals

Singles
 Jimmy Connors defeated  Charlie Pasarell 3–6, 6–3, 6–3
 It was Connors' 8th singles title of the year and 14th of his career.

Doubles
 Gerald Battrick /  Graham Stilwell defeated  Colin Dibley /  Charlie Pasarell 6–4, 7–6

References

External links
 ITF tournament edition details

Buckeye Tennis Championships
Buckeye Tennis Championships
Buckeye Tennis Championships
Buckeye Tennis Championships
Buckeye Tennis Championships